Lateosepsis is a genus of flies in the family Sepsidae.

Species
Lateosepsis laticornis (Duda, 1926)

References

Sepsidae
Diptera of South America
Brachycera genera